Coscinia mariarosae is a moth of the family Erebidae. It was described by A. Expósito-Hermosa in 1991. It is endemic to Mallorca.

References

Callimorphina
Moths described in 1991